In shogi, 1... R-32  (2手目☖3二飛 ) is a Third File Rook opening in which White's rook is positioned on the 32 square on White's first move.

When played by Black, the opening is known as 1. R-78 (初手７八飛 ).

See also

 Third File Rook
 Ranging Rook

Bibliography

 長岡, 裕也. 2008. 2手目の革新: 3二飛車戦法. 毎日コミュニケーションズ.
 佐藤, 康光. 2010. 佐藤康光の石田流破り. 日本将棋連盟.
久保, 利明. 2011. 久保の石田流. 日本将棋連盟.

External links

 Yamajunn's Shogi Opening Traps: 
 Niteme San-ni Hi Senpou Part 1
 Niteme San-ni Hi Senpou Part 2
 Niteme San-ni Hi Senpou Part 3
 Shogi Planet (Evernote documents): 3rd File · 1...R32 opening
 Yoshiharu Habu and Modern Shogi: Chapter 4: The Charm of Professional Shogi Players · Koichi Fukaura's Sociality
 三間飛車のひとくちメモ 新館: 猫だまし戦法
 三間飛車のひとくちメモ 新館: 猫だまし（初手▲７八飛）戦法講座 

Shogi openings
Ranging Rook openings
Third File Rook openings